The discography of American rock band Tool consists of five studio albums, one box set, two extended plays, four video albums, fifteen singles and nine music videos.

Tool was founded in 1990 by vocalist Maynard James Keenan and guitarist Adam Jones, who then recruited drummer Danny Carey and bassist Paul D'Amour. They initially released a demo EP in 1991 called 72826. Although demos are typically intended only for record labels, the band was so pleased with theirs that they sold copies to their fans. Tool signed to Zoo Entertainment just three months into their career, and released their first studio EP, Opiate, in March 1992. After touring to positive reviews, they released their first full-length album, Undertow, in April 1993. The album was certified triple platinum by the Recording Industry Association of America (RIAA) in 2021.

Shortly after entering the studio to record their second album in September 1995, the band experienced its only lineup change to date, with bassist D'Amour leaving amicably to pursue other projects. He was replaced by Justin Chancellor and recording resumed. October 1996 saw the release of Ænima which eventually beat Tool's debut in sales, and was certified triple platinum by the RIAA in 2003. The third single from the album, "Ænema", won the Grammy Award for Best Metal Performance in 1998. Following legal battles with their label, the band went on hiatus. Tool returned in May 2001 with the release of Lateralus. The album reached number one on the US Billboard 200 chart in its debut week, and was certified triple platinum in April 2021. The first single, "Schism", won a Grammy Award for Best Metal Performance in 2002. Again waiting five years between releases, 10,000 Days was released in May 2006. The album sold 564,000 copies in its opening week in the US, debuted at number one on the Billboard 200, and was certified double platinum by the RIAA in April 2021. The album won a Grammy Award for Best Recording Package in 2007. In August 2019, Tool released Fear Inoculum.

Albums

Studio albums

Box sets

Extended plays / demos

Singles

Other charted songs

Videos

Video albums

Music videos

Notes

References

External links
 Official website
 Tool at AllMusic
 

Heavy metal group discographies
Discographies
Discographies of American artists